OT or Ot may refer to:

Arts and entertainment
 OT (band), a Serbian pop/rock band
 Ot, stage name of Anupong Prathompatama, a member of the Thai rock band Carabao
 Operation Transformation (TV series), an Irish health and fitness programme
 OT: Our Town, a 2002 documentary film about a high school in Compton, California that stages Thornton Wilder's Our Town
 Operación Triunfo (Spanish TV series), a Spanish reality television talent show
 Ot, the title character of Ot el bruixot, a Spanish comic strip
 Ot, one of the two main characters of Ot en Sien, a Dutch children's book series

Businesses and organizations
 Oakville Transit, the bus company serving Oakville, Ontario, Canada
 Obsession Telescopes, an American telescope maker
 Organisation Todt, a civil and military engineering group of Nazi Germany
 Oyu Tolgoi, a mine in Mongolia

Religion
 Old Testament, the first part of the Christian Bible
 Operating Thetan, a spiritual state in Scientology
 Ot Ene, the Mongolian goddess of marriage

Science and technology
Medicine
 Occupational therapy
 Occupational therapist
 Oxytocin, a mammalian hormone

Other uses in science and technology
 Oblivious transfer, a type of cryptography protocol
 Operational Technology, hardware/software technology dedicated to physical assets in an enterprise
 Operational transformation, an optimistic concurrency control method for group editing
 Optimality Theory, a linguistic model
 Oxygenated treatment, used to reduce corrosion in a boiler

People
 Ot of Urgell (c. 1065–1122), Catholic saint and bishop of Urgell
 Ot de Montcada, 11th century Catalan troubadour
 Ot Pi Isern, Spanish bike-trials rider
 Ot Louw (1946–2021), Dutch film editor
 Oswald Tschirtner (1920–2007), Austrian artist also known as O.T.

Acronym
 Offensive tackle, either of two football positions
 Overtime (sports), a sports game past regulation because of a tie game
 Off topic
 Overtime, a designation indicating working past normal work hours

Other uses
 Ot (Cyrillic) (Ѿ, ѿ), a letter of the early Cyrillic alphabet
 The OT'', a television postgame show of NFL on Fox
 Oakville Trafalgar High School, Oakville, Ontario, Canada
 Otmoor or Ot Moor, an area of wetland and wet grassland in Oxfordshire, England
 Aeropelican Air Services, IATA airline designator OT
 O-T map, a type of medieval world map

See also 
 Ott (disambiguation)
 O. T. Fagbenle (born 1981), also referred to as O-T Fagbenle, British actor, writer and director

Masculine given names